PS Duchess of Connaught was a passenger vessel built for the London and South Western Railway and London, Brighton and South Coast Railway in 1884.

History

The ship was built in steel by Aitken and Mansel and launched on 29 April 1884 by Miss Livingstone of Glasgow. She was constructed for a joint venture between the London and South Western Railway and the London, Brighton and South Coast Railway for the passenger trade to the Isle of Wight. Steam was provided from four steel boilers which could produce 110 lbs per square inch. The design of the vessel was overseen by Mr Stroudley, engineer of the London, Brighton and South Coast Railway.

She undertook her trial on 18 July 1884.

She was scrapped in 1910.

References

1884 ships
Steamships of the United Kingdom
Paddle steamers of the United Kingdom
Ships built on the River Clyde
Ships of the London and South Western Railway
Ships of the London, Brighton and South Coast Railway